Vempati is one of the Indian surnames.
 Vempati Chinna Satyam is a legendary dancer and a guru of Kuchipudi dance form.
 Vempati Sadasivabrahmam was a versatile film writer.